Sonam Lamba (born 26 February 1996) is an Indian television actress known for her character of Vidya Shravan Suryavanshi in Saath Nibhaana Saathiya on Star Plus.

Life and career

Birth and early work 

Lamba was born in Chandigarh and initially appeared as Ritu Pandey, younger sister of the titular female protagonist on Desh Ki Beti Nandini (2013–14). She also made appearances in the shows ‘Balika Vadhu’ and ‘Diya Aur Bati Hum’.  Balika Vadhu and Diya Aur Baati Hum.

Breakthrough (2015–2018)

In 2015, Lamba rose to limelight with her portrayal of Vidya Ahem Modi in the popular daily soap Saath Nibhaana Saathiya and continued until its culmination in 2017.

In April 2018, Lamba was locked for an important role in Rishta Likhenge Hum Naya. However she eventually opted out of the show owing to various changes in story track.

In 2021, she made her comeback with Anjan TV's Ek Duje Ki Parchai, in which she is portraying the female lead role of Sandhya. 

Sonam was seen in an episode of Zing TV’s Pyaar Tune Kya Kiya on 23rd October 2021, as Suman.

In 2022, Sonam entered Colors TV’s Sasural Simar Ka 2,  playing the role of Labuni.

Television

References

Living people
1995 births
Actresses from Chandigarh
Indian television actresses
Indian soap opera actresses
Actresses in Hindi television
21st-century Indian actresses